Dolga Raka is a small settlement south of Raka in the Municipality of Krško in eastern Slovenia. The area is part of the traditional region of Lower Carniola. It is now included with the rest of the municipality in the Lower Sava Statistical Region.

There is a small chapel-shrine in the settlement dedicated to the Virgin Mary. It was built in the early 20th century.

References

External links
Dolga Raka on Geopedia

Populated places in the Municipality of Krško